This list is of the Cultural Properties of Japan designated in the category of  for the Prefecture of Saga.

National Cultural Properties
As of 1 August 2019, two Important Cultural Properties have been designated, being of national significance.

Prefectural Cultural Properties
As of 1 August 2019, twenty-one properties have been designated at a prefectural level.

See also
 Cultural Properties of Japan
 List of National Treasures of Japan (paintings)
 Japanese painting
 List of Historic Sites of Japan (Saga)

References

External links
  Cultural Properties in Saga Prefecture

Cultural Properties,Saga
Cultural Properties,Paintings
Paintings,Saga